Cheltenham is a suburb in the Northern Sydney region of Sydney, in the state of New South Wales, Australia. Cheltenham is 18 kilometres north-west of the Sydney central business district in the local government area of Hornsby Shire.

Cheltenham is a small residential affluent suburb with a distinctive English atmosphere, characterised by a number of 19th century mansions on tree-lined streets. Cheltenham shares its postcode of 2119 with Beecroft and has sometimes been viewed as part of the suburb. Most residents of Cheltenham see themselves as distinct from Beecroft, although local issues are addressed together in the Beecroft Cheltenham Civic Trust.

History
Cheltenham takes its name from a house built by William Chorley, a Sydney tailor and men's outfitter, who acquired the land when it was released from the Field of Mars Reserve. He named the house after his birthplace of Cheltenham, Gloucestershire, England. Chorley asked the government to build a station here and to name it after his property when it opened in 1898. Sutherland Road was named for John Sutherland, Minister for Public Works from 1887 to 1889.

Beecroft Cheltenham History Group

The Beecroft Cheltenham History Group was founded in 1987 by local history enthusiasts to record the history of Beecroft and Cheltenham and to collect and preserve photos and other historical information relative to the area. Since 2005 it has been part of the Beecroft Cheltenham Civic Trust. In 1995 a book covering the history of Beecroft and Cheltenham up to 1914 was published. In 2004 a book on walks around the district was published. In 2005 a book about the Beecroft Children's Library was published.

Heritage listings
Cheltenham has a number of heritage-listed sites, including:
 67 Cobran Road: Ahimsa

Demographics
According to the 2016 census, there were 2,243 residents in Cheltenham. 
 Ethnic diversity  67.0% of people were born in Australia. The next most common country of birth was China at 8.2%.  The most common ancestries in Cheltenham were English 23.0%, Australian 21.1%, Chinese 15.5%, Irish 7.6% and Scottish 7.4%. 69.3% of people only spoke English at home. Other languages spoken at home included Mandarin 8.5% and Cantonese 7.1%. 
 Age distribution  The average age of people in Cheltenham was 43, compared to the national median of 38. Children aged under 15 made up 18.2% of the population, and people aged 65 and over made up 16.3% of the population.
 Income  Cheltenham is a wealthy suburb, with the median weekly household income being $3,170, more than double the national median weekly income of $1,438. 
 Housing  Nearly all of the dwellings in Cheltenham is made up of separate houses, being at 98.7%.
 Religion  The most common responses for religion were No Religion 34.2%, Anglican 16.6% and Catholic 14.4%.

Transport
Cheltenham railway station is on the Northern Line of the Sydney Trains network. It is one of the few stations with no surrounding business district, due to William Chorley placing covenants on the surrounding land.

The M2 Hills Motorway runs along the southern border of the suburb. For many years, Sutherland Road ran through both Beecroft and Cheltenham, and acted as a shortcut between Beecroft Road and Epping Road. This road ran to the east of the Railway line and, during peak hour, was quite busy. With the opening of the M2 Hills Motorway in 1997, Sutherland Road was closed at the Devlins Creek bridge - where the M2 enters a tunnel under North Epping. The result of this closure is that the areas east of the railway line are now very quiet, and the house values have benefitted.

Schools
Cheltenham Girls' High School, a government school, is located along Beecroft Road and The Promenade. Beecroft Public School and Arden Anglican School are primary schools in nearby Beecroft.

Commercial area
From its early days, Cheltenham was almost exclusively a residential suburb with no shopping area developed at all in its planning. Residents of Cheltenham often shop in Beecroft, Pennant Hills or Epping. The nearest shopping mall is in Carlingford.

Ahimsa

Ahimsa (an Indian word meaning non-violence) is the name of a bush retreat located in Cobran Road. It was originally the home of the environmentalist Marie Byles, who died in the house in 1979. It can be accessed at the rear of Day Road and Cobran Road (both roads are cul-de-sacs). The site is administered by the National Trust of Australia. The house is leased privately but the bush area is open to the public within certain restrictions.

References

 Beecroft Cheltenham Civic Trust webpage
  (295 pages)

External links

  [CC-By-SA]
  Cheltenham suburb profile @ domain.com.au

Suburbs of Sydney
Hornsby Shire
Lane Cove River